William Saluga (born September 16, 1937), aka Ray Jay Johnson, is an American comedian and founding member of the improvisational comedy troupe Ace Trucking Company.  He has appeared on several television programs, including Seinfeld.

Youngstown, Ohio, native Saluga is best known for his cigar-smoking, zoot-suit-wearing television character Raymond J. Johnson Jr., famous for his catchphrase "You can call me Ray, or you can call me Jay, or you can call me…" The character then proceeds to list almost every conceivable permutation of his name before finishing with "…but you doesn't has to call me Johnson!"

Raymond J. Johnson Jr.
Saluga's shtick would be, when someone would refer to him as "Mr. Johnson" or by the common generic nickname "Johnson," to exaggeratedly feign offense and list off all permutations of the name Raymond J. Johnson Jr. and nicknames thereof that do not mention the word "Johnson:"

"NOOO!!! You don't have to call me Johnson! My name is Raymond J. Johnson Jr.  Now you can call me Ray, or you can call me J, or you can call me Johnny, or you can call me Sonny, or you can call me Junie, or you can call me Junior; now you can call me Ray J, or you can call me RJ, or you can call me RJJ, or you can call me RJJ Jr. . . but you doesn't hasta call me Johnson!" 

He would then smugly turn away and begin puffing on his cigar.

The spiel received more widespread attention in the late 1970s after being used in a series of commercials for Miller Lite beer, and subsequently, in the early 1980s for Anheuser-Busch Natural Light beer. Saluga appeared alongside comedian/pitchman Norm Crosby echoing (in a roundabout way) Norm's advice to unknowing customers on how to more easily order the lengthily-named beer: "Well, y'doesn't hasta call it Anheuser Busch Natural Light Beer, and y'doesn't hasta call it 'Busch Natural.'  Just say 'Natural!'" Saluga then later launches into the "You can call me Ray" routine after Crosby warns not to ask Johnson his name. 

Saluga, as Raymond J. Johnson Jr., was also a frequent guest on Chuck Barris' The Gong Show during 1977 and 1978.

During 1977-78, Saluga appeared regularly as Raymond J. Johnson Jr. on Redd Foxx's eponymous variety show. Saluga as Johnson also made appearances on This Is Tom Jones, Laugh-In  and The David Steinberg Show.

A novelty disco single called "Dancin' Johnson" was based around Johnson's schtick was released in 1978. 

Bob Dylan references the "you may call me" schtick in his 1979 hit, "Gotta Serve Somebody," when he sings, "You may call me Terry, you may call me Timmy / You may call me Bobby, you may call me Zimmy / You may call me R.J., you may call me Ray / You may call me anything, but no matter what you say / You’re gonna have to serve somebody." The idea for the verse originated from Jerry Wexler, who suggested it during the recording sessions for Slow Train Coming.

Saluga sent his Johnson persona up in episodes of both The Simpsons in 2002 and King of the Hill in 2010.

Bibliography

References

External links

1937 births
Living people
People from Youngstown, Ohio
Comedians from Ohio
American sketch comedians
American television personalities